A  is a shoe cupboard in Japan, usually situated in the , an entryway or porch of the house. This is often called a cubby in the United States. In Japan, it is considered uncouth to not remove one's shoes before entering the house. The  is usually made of wood and bamboo, and there are many sold all over the world.

Usually there are big  in schools, and each student has their own section. Sometimes students store personal things there as well, or use them to leave love letters.

See also 
 Locker

References 

Cabinets (furniture)
Japanese home